Mister Belgium Personality is the oldest national male beauty pageant in Belgium, responsible for selecting the country's representatives to Mister International, Men Universe Model and Manhunt International pageants. The organization established in 2013. Since 2014 it organizes national pageant Mister Belgium Personality. The winner expected to promote "Mister" (to be a-year long promotion carries himself and appearances), "Model" (to become role model of his country), and "Personality" (to represent his strong and pleasant personality). The last winner is Fabio Ronti (Brussels).

Titleholders
  (Semifinalist at Mister International or other pageants)
 Community/region:  (Capital),  (Flanders),  (Wallonia)

See also 
Miss Belgium

References

External links 
 

Belgian awards
Recurring events established in 2003
2003 establishments in Belgium
Male beauty pageants
Beauty pageants in Belgium